Daphnella diluta is a species of sea snail, a marine gastropod mollusk in the family Raphitomidae.

Description
The length of the shell attains 10 mm, its diameter 4.25 mm.

The white oblong-ovate shell is sparsely maculate with red dots. The spire is acutely conical. The shell contains 6 convex, rounded whorls, subtly spirally striated. The large body whorl is oval and not rostrate. The aperture is wide. The outer lip is thin and arcuate, moderately sinuous below.

Distribution
This marine species is endemic to Australia and occurs off South Australia.

References

 Cotton, B.C. 1947. Australian Recent and Tertiary Turridae. Adelaide : Field Naturalist's Section of the Royal Society of South Australia. Conchology Club Vol. 4 pp. 1-34.

External links
  Hedley, C. 1922. A revision of the Australian Turridae. Records of the Australian Museum 13(6): 213-359, pls 42-56 
 Petit, R. E. (2009). George Brettingham Sowerby, I, II & III: their conchological publications and molluscan taxa. Zootaxa. 2189: 1–218
 

diluta
Gastropods described in 1896
Gastropods of Australia